Hollingsworth Park, sometimes referred to as Hollingsworth Playground or simply Hollingsworth, is a public park and baseball complex in Braintree, Massachusetts, United States. The baseball complex located at Hollingsworth Park is known as the Michael F. Dunn Little League Complex and is home to Braintree American Little League. The Farm River runs past the west side of the park.

Playground 

The playground equipment at Hollingsworth Park was nearly 35 years old when it was torn down in March 2014 due to safety concerns. A new playground was planned in July 2014 and building would not start until after the baseball season ended. The Town of Braintree was awarded $145,787 from the state to build a new playground at Hollingsworth.

Baseball fields 
There are five baseball diamonds at William F. Dunn Little League Complex. One of the fields, Christopher Duffy Field or simply Duffy Field, is primarily to tee-ball for ages six and seven. The four other fields are used for ages eight to twelve. William G. Brooks Field or simply Brooks Field is the largest and only lighted field at Hollingsworth Park and is used for all majors league games which consists of ballplayers from ages ten to twelve, and also for significant summer travel events. Robert F. Rull Jr. Field or simply Rull Field, and Joseph J. Tarallo Field or simply Tarallo Field, formerly Hall of Fame Field, are secondary fields, in which "AAA" league games and other summer travel games are played. Roy Googins Field or simply Googins Field is used for "AA" league games, which consists of ages eight and nine, and for younger summer travel games.

Snack bar 
In March 2011, members from a local carpenters union, volunteered to build the new snack bar planned on the premises of Hollingsworth Park. The volunteer work saved Braintree American Little League an estimated of $10,000.

References 

Baseball venues in Massachusetts
Buildings and structures in Braintree, Massachusetts
Geography of Braintree, Massachusetts
Parks in Norfolk County, Massachusetts
Sports in Braintree, Massachusetts